The 2017 North American Championship was the inaugural edition of the tournament organized by the Professional Darts Corporation for North American players. The tournament took place at the Tropicana Las Vegas, Las Vegas, United States on 13 July 2017, and featured the 8 players from the North American side of players that had qualified for the 2017 US Darts Masters, competing in a knockout system, with the winner earning a place in the 2018 PDC World Darts Championship.

 won the title after defeating  6–5 in the final.

Format
The format of the tournament used a leg format, with all the matches being the best of 11 legs (or first to 6 legs).

Prize money
The total prize fund was US$25,000. The winner of the tournament got a spot in the 2018 PDC World Darts Championship.

Qualifiers
The eight qualifiers for the tournament were the 8 players from the North American side of players on the 2017 US Darts Masters.

The qualifiers were:

Draw

References

North American Championship
North American Championship
North American Championship